English whisky is whisky produced in England. At least eight distilleries currently produce it, and there are 26 whisky distilleries across England in various stages of development. Though England is not well known for whisky, distillers operated in London, Liverpool and Bristol until the late 19th century, after which production of English single malt whisky ceased until 2003. Since then, English whisky has experienced a resurgence in production.

History

England, like Scotland, has a history of producing single malt whisky. However, the production of English single malt whisky ceased around 1905 with the closure of Lea Valley Distillery, in Stratford, London, by the Distillers Company Limited, one of the forerunners of Diageo.

In the 1887 book The Whisky Distilleries of the United Kingdom by Alfred Barnard, the following English distilleries were listed:
 Lea Valley Distillery, Stratford, Essex  (founded in the late 19th century) — produced both grain and malt whisky.
 Bank Hall Distillery (Liverpool) — produced grain and malt whisky.
 Bristol Distillery (founded in the 17th century) — produced grain whisky which was "sent to Scotland and Ireland to make a Blended Scotch and Irish whisky, for whisky purpose it is specially adapted, and stands in high favour".
 Vauxhall Distillery in Liverpool (founded in 1781) — produced grain whisky.

In 2005, The English Whisky Co. Ltd got permission to build the first registered whisky distillery in England for over a century; it first release of single malt occurred in 2009; which became the only English Whisky to have been bottled and released for over 100 years. In 2013 The London Distillery Company began production of the first single malt whisky in London since Lea Valley Distillery closed in 1903. Two other English distilleries, also producing whisky by 2014, were The Lakes Distillery and The Cotswolds Distillery.

Distilleries

Bimber Distillery
The Park Royal, London based Bimber Distillery was founded in 2016.

The alembic stills are Doris, a 1000-litre wash and Astraeus a spirit still of 600 litres made by Hoga.
On 26 May 2016 the first cask was filled and three years later The First was available September 2019.

In 2017 a vodka was released followed by a rum the following year; gin is also part of the product line.

The sales director announced in June 2019 that they are looking for a new location to expand their production and increase the number of visitors.

Chase Distillery

The Chase Distillery known for their Gin & Vodka ranges, started to lay down whisky in 2012 at a rate of 1 a week. 
The Whisky made from corn, rye, or barley was developed together with Hobsons Brewery in Shropshire. There is no known release before 2021. 

On 26 October 2020 Diageo announced that it acquired Chase Distillery.

Cooper King Distillery
Cooper King Distillery is an independent English distillery based in Sutton on the Forest, which was founded after the owners spent time living in Tasmania and became inspired by the Australian whisky industry.

Established in 2016 by founders Christopher Jaume and Abbie Neilson, the distillery started producing gin in early 2018 and casked their first single malt spirit in August 2019. They named the distillery after co-founder Chris Jaume's great-great-grandfather, Lieutenant Colonel Charles Cooper King, who traced the family's history back to Yorkshire in 1030 AD.

The whisky is produced using a 900-litre electrically heated copper pot still, that was made by still-maker Peter Bailly at Knapp Lewer Contracting, a company based in Hobart, Tasmania

Casks for the distillery are handmade at Jensen's Cooperage by Alastair Simms, one of England's last master coopers.
 
Environmental responsibility is a priority for the founders: Vacuum gin stills are used to lower the energy consumption and water use of the distillation process; The distillery is powered by 100% renewable energy; Customers can refill their empty gin bottles on site; For every bottle sold, one square metre of native English woodland is planted in the Yorkshire Dales; In February 2021, they announced production of England's first carbon-negative gins; Their Carbon Report - documenting how carbon-negativity was achieved - is publicly available on their website with a view to helping others to follow suit; Zero waste is sent to landfill.

The distillery has received grant funding from the European Agricultural Fund for Rural Development through PAPI.

(Adnams) Copper House Distillery

The Copper House Distillery was built by the Southwold based brewer Adnams in 2010. Their first whisky was released in 2013. They also distill gin, vodka, bierbrand and brandy.

Copper Rivet Distillery

The Copper Rivet Distillery, based in a Grade II listed building in Chatham, Kent, was founded by Bob Russell and his sons Matthew and Stephen, in August 2016. 

The distillery has three stills; Sandy (pot), Joyce (column), and Janet (gin). Janet was designed by head distiller Abhi Banik and was granted a patent in 2019. For the production of Single Malt Whisky Sandy is used she can load 2000 litres of wash. Joyce is for the Vela Vodka and the base alcohol of the Dockyard Gin. Janet, will add the flavours to the gin through  maceration and vapour distillation.

The first whisky release, branded Malthouse, was launched in November 2020.

The Cotswolds Distillery

The Cotswolds Distillery was established in 2014, and was the first full-scale distillery to be located in the Cotswolds Area of Outstanding Natural Beauty (AONB). Situated in a  site in Stourton in Warwickshire, its focus is distilling single malt whisky.

Circumstance Distillery

Circumstance Distillery, based in the Redfield district of Bristol, is the sister distillery of Psychopomp. In the same style as their approach to botanical spirits, they create grain spirit from any cereal possible utilising the features of their stainless potstill with 4 and 12 plated columns while using wide variety of casks. There isn't a known whisky release before 2021.

Dartmoor Whisky Distillery

Situated in Bovey Tracey, Simon Crow placed a 1200 litre ex-cognac still in the Old Town House to start the Dartmoor Whisky Distillery in 2017.

	
Guided by head distiller Frank McHardy, long time whisky industry veteran, the first whisky was casked on 3 February 2017. Three and half years later the first single malt whisky was released.

Durham Distillery
Durham Distillery was founded in 2014 as a gin distillery in Langley Park, County Durham and moved in 2020 to the Prince Bishops Shopping Centre in Durham, England.

They started the distillery with a 400-litre Hoga pot still, Lily, to produce gin, vodka and liqueur. With the investment of the Finance Durham Fund the distillery was planning to move to the city centre in 2018, what they were able to do in 2020. The production is the responsibility of the master distiller Jessica Tomlinson, a graduate from Heriot-Watt University who is involved from the start. Owing to the delayed move, no whisky was distilled before November 2019.

East London Liquor Company

East London Liquor Company is based in a building that was once a glue factory in Bow Wharf, East London.

The company was founded by former actor, Alex Wolpert in 2014. Head distiller, Tom Hills makes Single Malt, Rye, Wheat Whisky, Gin, and Wheat Vodka with the two 450-650 litres Holstein stills, 

The London Rye (42% Rye, 58% Barley) was first release in December 2018.

In 2019 a Single malt was released, followed in 2020 by the London Wheat (35% unmalted wheat, 30% heirloom malted barley, 30% malted wheat, 5% corn).

In May 2018, £1.5 m was raised to enlarge the whisky production.

Henstone Distillery 

Alison & Shane Parr, owners of the Stone House Brewery in Morda, Shropshire started the Henstone distillery together with Alexandra & Chris Toller in 2017 with the aid of the European Agricultural Fund for Rural Development

The equipment of the brewery supplies the Wash for the 1000 litre Kothe still Hilda, with which they make a whisky, brandy, gin & vodka. 

Their first whisky was released on 23 January 2021.

Hicks & Healey

In 2003 two of Cornwall's drinks producers, St Austell Brewery and Healey's Cyder Farm, announced that they had begun to produce the first whisky in England for almost a century.

In September 2011 the partnership released a 7-year old single malt and opted to use the spelling "whiskey". Whisky commentator and author of The Whisky Bible, Jim Murray, described the whisky as "among the best debut bottlings of the last decade".

Isle of Wight Distillery
The Isle of Wight Distillery is known for their gin & vodka brand, Mermaid but also started distilling whisky in December 2015.

The founders Xavier Baker and Conrad Gauntlett started the distilling at Conrad's Rosemary Vineyard in 2014. Four years later, they moved to the Pondwell's pub The Wishing Well.

The stills have the capacity of 100 and 300 litre. In spring 2019 they planned to install a custom designed 1,000 litre still. Big Bertha was operating in May 2020.

The first whisky was released in December 2018, for this single malt, the wort was brewed in Ryde at the Goddards Brewery where Xavier is managing director.

Lakesland Distillery

An unfruitful initiative of Harold Currie co-founder of Arran Distillery and his son Andrew Currie.  Harold's other son, Paul Currie, would found The Lakes Distillery.

Andrew published his plans in 2004 for a distillery in the old Bobbin Mill in Staveley.
In 2006 work on the distillery was progressing, aiming for a Christmas opening. 	

However, in 2007 the project was abandoned.

The Lakes Distillery 
The distillery is repurposing an old Victorian farmstead that is standing on the shore of Bassenthwaite Lake in the Lake District National Park. The eponymously named distillery was founded by Paul Currie, ex-Arran Distillery, Alan Rutherford, Nigel Mills, and master distiller Chris Anderson.

The Heriot-Watt graduate Dhavall Gandhi was appointed master blender in 2016, his previous position was at The Macallan.

The distillery opened on 15 December 2014, a few days after they put the 5,500 litre McMillan stills into production.

It wasn't until 22 July 2015 that Princess Anne opened the distillery officially. 

In 2019 the distillery announced an expansion plan that would nearly double their production capacity. 

Initially the company release a blended whisky The One before they released their first self-produced  The Lakes Genesis on 29 June 2018.

In May 2018 an annual release, Quatrefoil, was introduced (Faith, Hope, Luck, Love).  
	
A restyling of the brand was done in September 2019 with the release of The Whiskymaker's Reserve No.1. 

Besides whisky the distillery also makes gin & vodka with a 1,000 litre still.

The London Distillery Company

The London Distillery Company was the first whisky Distillery in London for over 100years. Originally, based in a former dairy cold room in Battersea, London until December 2015 before moving to a railway arch in Bermondsey.

TLDC was registered with Companies House in July 2011 by Darren Rook,
 and investor and former microbrewery owner, Nick Taylor.

Rook resigned as CEO in late 2017. His replacement failed multiple times to secure funding from new & existing investors. In January 2020, the company went into administration. The British Honey Company purchased the Dodd's Gin and Rye brands.

Ludlow Distillery
The Hardingham Family, who also run the Ludlow Vineyard, placed in 2008 a 200-litre Kothe still on their Clee St. Margaret's estate. It wasn't until 2014 that they started to distill whisky. The first peated version was released in 2018 as Young Prince, commemoration Edward V of England who was based in Ludlow Castle

They also produce Brandy, Apple Brandy, Eau de vie and Marc.

The Oxford Artisan Distillery

The Oxford Artisan Distillery (TOAD) is located next to the Headington's South Park in the old city council depot at Cheney Farm. In 2017, Tom Nicolson and Tagore Ramoutar founded the distillery where master distiller Cory Mason, started distilling rye whisky, gin, and vodka.

 
Four organic farms, all near Oxford, supplies the distillery with rye, wheat, and barley.

The largest still "Nautilus" has a capacity of 2,400 litres with a column of 42 plates; a smaller 500-litre still known as "Nemo". Both were built by South Devon Railway Engineering.

In Spring 2021, the distillery launched its rye whisky, produced by the Portuguese master distiller, Chico Rosa.

Princetown Distillery
The company Princetown Distilleries filed their plans to build a whisky distillery in December 2016. 

Located at an elevation of 1,400 ft, in Princetown, Dartmoor National Park it will outrank Dalwhinnie in that category.

The design is by Gareth Roberts working for Organic Architects who previously was involved in the realisation of Ardnamurchan distillery, Dartmoor Distillery, Lindores Abbey Distillery, and Nc’nean distillery. 

Building started in August 2018.

The Spirit of Manchester Distillery
Now based underneath renovated former railway arches on Watson Street in Manchester, The distillery was founded in 2016 by owners Jen and Seb, initially beginning with the production of gin from their dining room in Chorlton.

Production of whisky began in 2022 and currently takes place on their carbon neutral, 750L pot still 'Leo', named after Leonardo Fibonacci and his golden ratio, tying into the brand name of 'One Point Six Whisky'.

Spirit of Yorkshire Distillery

Based in Hunmanby, near Scarborough, North Yorkshire. Partnered with the Woldtop Brewery Co., this distillery has been producing single malt since 2016.

From the barley grown on their farm and the water off their estate they make a single malt. For that, they use oil fired Forsyth Stills.
The spirit still is 3,500 L while the wash still is 5,000 L with which they aim to produce 80,000 litres per annum.

Their single malt whisky is bottled since 2019 under the Filey Bay label.

Like many of the other distillery that used the consultancy of the late Jim Swan (1941-2017), the company offers STR expression.

St George's Distillery

St George's Distillery in Roudham, Norfolk, began production in 2006 and was the first registered whisky distillery in England for over a century,

The company founder James Nelstrop described it as a 45-year-old dream to make whisky in Norfolk and said that barley has historically been sent from Norfolk to Scotland to make whisky.

Wharf Distillery

Wharf Distillery is an independent small batch distillery founded in 2014 by Laurence Conisbee to produce apple brandy, Aeppel Drenc, from its own cider (Virtual Orchard Cider).

The distillery uses two 300-litre, hand-beaten copper pot alembic stills from Portugal. Their range now includes gin Safine Drenc, vodka Gadan Drenc, Fyr Drenc, a malt (barley/rye) spirit drink, and brandy Æppel Drenc

Their first whisky, named Cattle Creep after the narrow tunnel passing under the nearby Grand Union Canal, was released in January 2019. Matured in a 55L Madeira cask, this very limited release was bottled at 42.9% with a cask strength Distiller's Cut at 58.8% being made available in June 2019. The release of their whisky will made them England's smallest whisky distillery.

The distillery takes its name from its original location on Galleon Wharf alongside the Grand Union Canal, although it is currently located in the market town of Towcester, Northamptonshire.

White Peak Distillery
On the limestone plateau within the Peak District close to village Ambergate stands, on the bank of the river Derwent, an old wire factory. Claire & Max Vaughan started the White Peak Distillery in 2017, in one of the buildings of this complex. 

The first spirit for the whisky is casked in the spring of 2018.
 In the meantime the progress can be followed by the single malt spirit that is released. Gin and rum are also part of the companies product range.

Whittaker's Distillery
The Whittaker's intended to brew beer but a study at Heriot Watt changed his mind. 

Starting off in 2015 making gin with two 100 litre Hillbilly stills on their farm in Dacre Banks.

The first step into whisky production was taken in 2018, when an expansion plan was announced. That distillery was officially opened by Earl of Harewood in August 2019.

The new still is made by ABE and has a 1,000 litre capacity.

Date Table

See also

 Outline of whisky

References

Bibliography

External links

Distilleries 
 Bimber Distillery
 Chase Distillery
 Cooper King Distillery
 Adnams Copper House Distillery
 Copper Rivet Distillery
 The Cotswolds Distillery
 Circumstance Distillery
 Dartmoor Whisky Distillery
 Durham Distillery
 East London Liquor Company
 The Forest Distillery
 Henstone Distillery
 Hicks & Healey 
 Isle of Wight Distillery
 The Lakes Distillery
 The London Distillery Company Ltd
 Ludlow Distillery
 The Oxford Artisan Distillery
 Princetown Distillery
 Spirit of Yorkshire Distillery
 The English Whisky Co.
 Wharf Distillery 
 White Peak Distillery
 Whittaker's Distillery

Still-makers  
The manufactures of the English whisky distillery stills.
 ABE Beverage Equipment 
 CARL Artisan Distilleries and Brewing Systems
  Forsyths
 Hillbilly Stills
 Hoga
 Kothe
 South Devon Railway
 McMillan

English alcoholic drinks
Whisky by country